Stavka of the Supreme Commander was the administrative staff of the Supreme Commander of the Armed Forces of Imperial Russia, during the First World War of 1914–1918. The term "Stavka" means tent, referring to the military camp of a chief.

The Stavka was originally established at Baranavichy. In the summer of 1915, after the German advance and the Russian retreat, the Stavka re-located to Mogilev.

Foreign military officers
Major-general John Hanbury-Williams was head of the British military mission in Russia and was attached to the Stavka.

See also
Military history of the Russian Empire

References

Joint military headquarters
Military units and formations of the Russian Empire